The 1941 College Football All-America team is composed of college football players who were selected as All-Americans by various organizations and writers that chose College Football All-America Teams in 1941. The nine selectors recognized by the NCAA as "official" for the 1941 season are (1) Collier's Weekly, as selected by Grantland Rice, (2) the Associated Press, (3) the United Press, (4) the All-America Board, (5) the International News Service (INS), (6) Liberty magazine, (7) the Newspaper Enterprise Association (NEA), (8) Newsweek, and (9) the Sporting News.

Harvard center Endicott Peabody, who won the 1941 Knute Rockne Award, was the only player to be unanimously named to the first team of all nine official selectors.  Dick Wildung of Minnesota and Bob Westfall of Michigan each received eight official first-team designations.  Bruce Smith of Minnesota won the 1941 Heisman Trophy and received seven official first-team nominations.

The United Press made its selections based on voting from sports editors and football writers and published the point totals for each player.  The players receiving the highest point totals were Virginia back Bill Dudley (598), Endicott Peabody (540), Tulane tackle Ernie Blandin (503), and Minnesota tackle Dick Wildung (487).

Liberty magazine based its selections on a poll conducted by Norman L. Sper of 2,000 varsity football players from over 100 leading colleges. Players were asked to select only players against whom they played. Georgia back Frank Sinkwich was selected by the greatest percentage, receiving votes from 96 of the 99 opponents who faced him.

Consensus All-Americans
For the year 1941, the NCAA recognizes nine published All-American teams as "official" designations for purposes of its consensus determinations. The following chart identifies the NCAA-recognized consensus All-Americans and displays which first-team designations they received.

All-American selections for 1941

Ends
 Holt Rast, Alabama (AAB-1; AP-2; INS-1; LIB; NEA-2; SN; NW; UP-1 [253]; CP-1; LIFE-1; PARA; WC-1, NYDN)
 Bob Dove, Notre Dame (College Football Hall of Fame) (AAB-1; AP-3; INS-1; NEA-1; NW; UP-1 [367]; LIFE-1; WC-1, NYDN)
 Malcolm Kutner, Texas (College Football Hall of Fame) (AP-1; INS-2; CO; CP-2. LIFE-2)
 Dave Schreiner, Wisconsin (College Football Hall of Fame) (AP-1)
 Joe Blalock, Clemson (SN; UP-2 [232]; CP-1, LIFE-3)
 John Rokisky, Duquesne (AP-2; INS-2; NEA-1; CO; CP-2; PARA)
 Jim Lansing, Fordham (LIB; CP-3)
 Nick Susoeff, Washington State (AP-3)
 Bob Froude, Navy (UP-2 [197])
 James Sterling, Texas A&M (NEA-2; NYS-1)
 Bob Motl, Northwestern (NEA-3)
 Alyn Beals, Santa Clara (NEA-3)
 Billy Henderson, Texas A&M (CP-3, LIFE-2)
 Dale Gentry, Washington State (NYS-1; LIFE-3)

Tackles
 Dick Wildung, Minnesota (College Football Hall of Fame) (AAB-1; AP-1; INS-1; LIB; NEA-1; NW; SN; UP-1 [487]; CP-1; LIFE-1; PARA; WC-1; NYDN)
 Ernie Blandin, Tulane (AP-2; CO; INS-2; LIB; NEA-1; NW; UP-1 [503]; NYS-1)
 Bob Reinhard, California (AP-1; UP-2 [213]; INS-1; NEA-2; CO; CP-3; PARA, LIFE-2)
 Alf Bauman, Northwestern (AAB-1; AP-2; INS-2; NEA-2; SN; CP-2; LIFE-1; NYS-1; NYDN)
 Jim Daniell, Ohio State (CP-1)
 Al Wistert, Michigan (UP-2 [270]; CP-2 [as G], LIFE-2)
 Gene Flathmann, Navy (CP-2)
 Bill Chewning, Navy (AP-3; NEA-3)
 Mike Karmazin, Duke (AP-3, LIFE-2 [as G])
 Floyd Spendlove, Utah (NEA-3)
 Paul Lillis, Notre Dame (CP-3, LIFE-3)
 John Wyhonic, Alabama (LIFE-3)

Guards
 Endicott Peabody, Harvard (College Football Hall of Fame) (AAB-1; AP-1; CO; INS-1; LIB; NEA-1; NW; SN; UP-1 [540]; CP-1; NYS-1; LIFE-1; PARA; WC-1; NYDN)
 Ray Frankowski, Washington (AAB-1; AP-2; INS-2; NEA-1; NW; UP-1 [369]; LIFE-1; WC-1)
 Chal Daniel, Texas (AP-3; INS-1; NEA-3; SN; CP-1, LIFE-3)
 Ralph Fife, Pittsburgh (AP-1; UP-2 [252]; NEA-2; CP-3, LIFE-2; NYDN)
 Bernard Crimmins, Notre Dame (CO; LIB; INS-2; NEA-2; UP-2 [364]; PARA)
 Chuck Taylor, Stanford (NYS-1)
 Martin Ruby, Texas A&M (CP-2)
 Ted Ramsey, SMU (AP-2)
 Tom Melton, Purdue (AP-3)
 Richard Pfister, Harvard (NEA-3)
 Art Goforth, Rice (CP-3)
 Urban Odson, Minnesota (LIFE-3)

Centers
 Darold Jenkins, Missouri (College Football Hall of Fame) (AAB-1; AP-1; INS-2; NEA-1; NW; SN; UP-1 [325]; CP-1; NYS-1; WC-1, LIFE-2)
 Vince Banonis, Detroit (College Football Hall of Fame) (AP-3; CO; INS-1; LIB; NEA-2; PARA; NYDN)
 Al DeMao, Duquesne (UP-2 [171]; NEA-3; LIFE-1)
 Quentin Greenough, Oregon State (AP-2, LIFE-3)
 Vic Lindskog, Stanford (CP-2)
 Bob Gude, Vanderbilt (CP-3)

Quarterbacks
 Frankie Albert, Stanford (College Football Hall of Fame) (AAB-1; AP-1; CO; INS-1; NEA-1; NW; SN; UP-2 [425]; CP-1; LIFE-1; PARA; WC-1; NYDN)
 Angelo Bertelli, Notre Dame (CP-2 [as hb])
 Billy Hillenbrand, Indiana (CP-2, LIFE-2)
 Bill Sewell, Washington State (AP-3; NEA-3)

Halfbacks
 Bruce Smith, Minnesota (College Football Hall of Fame) (AAB-1; AP-1; CO; INS-1; NEA-2; NW; SN; UP-1 [467]; CP-1; NYS-1; LIFE; PARA; WC-1, LIFE-1; NYDN)
 Frank Sinkwich, Georgia (College Football Hall of Fame) (AAB-1; AP-1; INS-2; LIB; NEA-3; SN; UP-1 [399]; CP-1; LIFE; WC-1, LIFE-1)
 Bill Dudley, Virginia (College and Pro Football Hall of Fame) (AP-1; CO; INS-2; LIB [qb]; NEA-2; NW; UP-1 [qb, 598]; CP-2; NYS-1 [as qb], LIFE-3)
 Jack Crain, Texas (AP-2; UP-2 [373]; NEA-2; CP-3 [as qb]; LIFE-1; NYDN)
 Jimmy Nelson, Alabama (AP-3; NEA-3; CP-3)
 Derace Moser, Texas A&M (AP-2; INS-2; NEA-1; CP-3)
 Jack Jenkins, Vanderbilt (AP-3)
 Bill Busik, Navy (LIFE-2)
 Angelo Bertelli, Notre Dame (LIFE-2)
 Hank Mazur, Army (LIFE-3)

Fullbacks
 Bob Westfall, Michigan (College Football Hall of Fame) (AAB-1; AP-2; CO; INS-1; LIB; NEA-1; NW; SN; UP-1 [467]; CP-1; NYS-1; PARA; WC-1, LIFE-3; NYDN)
 Steve Lach, Duke (College Football Hall of Fame) (AP-2; INS-1 [hb]; LIB [hb]; NEA-1; UP-2 [hb, 249]; CP-2; NYS-1 [as hb]; PARA; LIFE-2)
 Steve Filipowicz, Fordham (AP-3; UP-2 [211], LIFE-3)
 John Grigas, Holy Cross (INS-2; NEA-3)
 Merle Hapes, Ole Miss (NEA-2)
 Pete Layden, Texas (CP-3)

Key
Bold = Consensus All-American
 -1 – First-team selection
 -2 – Second-team selection
 -3 – Third-team selection

Official selectors
 AAB = All-America Board of Football, having Pop Warner as its chairman, selected by 48 football coaches on "the long-established All-America Board of Football, a group of professional selectors speaking for all states, all conferences, all sections of the football world"
 AP = Associated Press based on "a nation-wide survey of expert opinion"
 CO = Collier's Weekly, "the pioneer of the all-star field", selected by Grantland Rice and published in the December 13 issue of Collier's
 INS = International News Service, selected from a ballot of INS bureaus
 LIB = Liberty magazine, an "All-Players All-America team" based on polling of 2,000 varsity football players from over 100 leading colleges, asking them to select the best players against whom they played
 NEA = NEA Sports Syndicate, selected "with the aid of coaches, scouts, officials and football writers"
 NW = Newsweek
 SN = The Sporting News
 UP = United Press, based on voting from "sports and football writers from coast to coast"; point totals received by each player displayed in brackets

Other selectors
 CP = Central Press Association, also known as the "Captains' All-American team", "picked by a staff of experts after culling the selections of the nation's football captains"
 LIFE = Life magazine selected by sports announcer Bill Stern
 NYS = New York Sun, 17th year for the New York newspaper selecting its All-America team
 PARA = Paramount News, selected by Bill Slater, sports broadcaster and the primary voice of Paramount News reels beginning in 1936
 WC = Walter Camp Football Foundation
 NYDN = New York Daily News, fifth annual "All-America Sportswriters' All-America" based on polling of 100 sports departments in 48 states

See also
 1941 All-Big Six Conference football team
 1941 All-Big Ten Conference football team
 1941 All-Eastern football team
 1941 All-Pacific Coast Conference football team
 1941 All-SEC football team
 1941 All-Southern Conference football team
 1941 All-Southwest Conference football team

References

All-America Team
College Football All-America Teams